Frédéric Niemeyer was the defending champion, but lost in second round to Peter Polansky.

Dudi Sela won the title by defeating Kevin Kim 6–3, 6–0 in the final.

Seeds

Draw

Finals

Top half

Bottom half

References
 Main Draw (ATP)
 Qualifying Draw (ATP)

Odlum Brown Vancouver Open – Men's Singles
Vancouver Open